Annuar bin Rapaee (born 18 November 1963) is a Malaysian cardiologist and politician who has served as State Deputy Minister of Education, Innovation and Talent Development in the Gabungan Parti Sarawak (GPS) state administration under Premier Abang Abdul Rahman Johari Abang Openg since January 2022, Member of the Sarawak State Legislative Assembly (MLA) for Nangka since April 2011 and Chairman of the Board of Directors of University of Technology Sarawak since March 2021.  He is a member and Vice-President of Parti Pesaka Bumiputera Bersatu (PBB), a component party of the ruling GPS coalition.  He served as State Deputy Minister of Housing and Public Health, State Deputy Minister of Education, Science and Technological Research and State Deputy Minister in the Chief Minister's Department of Sarawak in the Barisan Nasional (BN) and GPS state administrations under Premiers Adenan Satem and Abang Johari from May 2016 to December 2021.

Early life and education 
Annuar started his primary education at Sekolah Kebangsaan Bandaran Sibu No.3 from 1970 to 1975, later continuing his secondary education at Sekolah Menengah Kebangsaan Rosli Dhoby from 1976 to 1981. After completing his secondary education, he pursued his pre-university studies at the University of Malaya (UM) from 1981 to 1983 in matriculation at its Centre for Foundation Studies.

Annuar later undertook his tertiary studies at UM until 1988, when he received his Bachelor of Medicine, Bachelor of Surgery (MBBS). He later pursued his postgraduate education at St James's University Hospital, Leeds in United Kingdom for Master of Medicine (MMed) in Internal Medicine. After completing his studies in the UK, he returned to Malaysia to continue his medical practice, and pursued his second postgraduate studies in Advance Master in Cardiology at National University of Malaysia (UKM), from 1998 to 2001.

Later in 2004, Annuar went to Germany to undergo Subspeciality Advance Training at the renowned Deutsches Herzzentrum Berlin. He is an expert in the field of cardiac MRI imaging and has trained other cardiologists during his stints in University of Malaysia, Sarawak (UNIMAS) and at Serdang Hospital in Selangor, Malaysia.

In 2022, Annuar furthered his studies to the law level. He is currently pursuing a three-year law degree from the University of Hertfordshire in United Kingdom through online learning offered through Brickfields Asia College (BAC).

Political career 
Annuar's political career began when he was nominated as the candidate for the N49 Nangka, as the incumbent Awang Bemee Awang Ali Basah did not wish to be re-nominated for the 2011 Sarawak state election. He was elected as the new Member of State Legislative Assembly (MLA) with a majority of 5,302 votes over the candidate from People's Justice Party (PKR), Norisham Mohamed Ali, an engineer in the oil and gas industry.

In the 2016 Sarawak state election, Annuar was re-elected for Nangka, with bigger majority of 7,617 votes, beating the PKR candidate Abdul Raafidin Majidi and State Reform Party (STAR) candidate Tiong Ing Tung.

Annuar took the oath of office as Deputy Minister at Chief Minister's Department on 19 May 2016, in a ceremony held at the Sarawak State Legislative Assembly Building, with the portfolio of Science Research and Biotechnology. On 7 May 2017, after the conclusion of PBB Special Assembly, he was announced as the Deputy Minister in the newly created Ministry of Education, Science and Technological Research (MESTR) and also Deputy Minister for Housing and Public Health.

Personal life 
Annuar married Haniza Zainal Abidin. The couple have two children.

Election results

Honours 
  :
  Commander of the Order of the Star of Hornbill Sarawak (PGBK) – Datuk (2022)
  Companion of the Most Exalted Order of the Star of Sarawak (JBS) (2020)

References

External links 
 Annuar Rapaee on Facebook

1963 births
Living people
Commanders of the Order of the Star of Hornbill Sarawak
People from Sarawak
21st-century Malaysian politicians
Malaysian Muslims
Parti Pesaka Bumiputera Bersatu politicians
Members of the Sarawak State Legislative Assembly
University of Malaya alumni
Melanau people
National University of Malaysia alumni
Malaysian cardiologists